Joe S. Carr is a former member of the Tennessee House of Representatives, and a member of the Tennessee Republican Party. Representative Carr was first elected as a state representative from the 48th legislative district in 2008 for the 106th Tennessee General Assembly. He served from 2008 through 2014 before stepping down to run against Senator Lamar Alexander in the Tennessee Republican Primary. Representative Carr ran an unsuccessful campaign for the United States Senate in the Republican primary, challenging incumbent Republican Lamar Alexander. On May 3, 2022, Carr won the Republican nomination for Rutherford County Mayor, and he went on to win the general election on August 4, 2022.

Career
Carr was first elected to the Tennessee House of Representatives in 2008. Carr decided instead to run for the United States Senate in the 2014 election, challenging incumbent Republican Lamar Alexander.

As of March 31, 2014, Carr had raised $866,383 and had $466,823 cash on hand.

Carr ran in the Tennessee State Senate District 14 Special Election in early 2018 for the vacant seat. The vacant seat was created after Jim Tracy's resignation to serve in federal administration.

On May 3, 2022, Carr won the Republican nomination for Rutherford County Mayor with 6,862 votes, narrowly defeating second place finisher Rhonda Allen, who earned 6,239 votes. The incumbent mayor Bill Ketron received 4,487 votes. On August 4, 2022, Carr went on to win the general election for mayor with 12,518 votes. He defeated three independent candidates: Randy Allen, who earned 10,387 votes; Royce Olen Johnson, who earned 2,705 votes; and Norman Hanks, who earned 1,853 votes.

Personal life
Carr graduated from Middle Tennessee State University in 1981. He and his wife, Ginny, have three children.  They live in Lascassas, near Murfreesboro.

References

External links
 Representatives Joe Carr
 Joe Carr for Senate

Living people
Heads of county government in Tennessee
Republican Party members of the Tennessee House of Representatives
Middle Tennessee State University alumni
Tea Party movement activists
People from Rutherford County, Tennessee
Year of birth missing (living people)